Elaine Yih-Nien Hsiao is an American biologist who is Professor in Biological Sciences at University of California, Los Angeles. Her research considers the microbes that impact human health. She was a 2022 Laureate for the Blavatnik Awards for Young Scientists.

Early life and education 
Hsiao was an undergraduate student in microbiology at the University of California, Los Angeles. After graduating she moved to California Institute of Technology, where she focused on neurobiology in the laboratory of Paul Patterson. At CalTech, she studied the neuroimmune system, and the molecular mechanisms that underpin disorders in neurodevelopment.

Research and career 
Hsiao moved to the research groups of Rustem F. Ismagilov and Sarkis Mazmanian. In 2015, Hsiao joined the UCLA Brain Research Institute as an assistant professor. She was made an associate professor in 2020. Hsiao is interested in microbes and how they regulate brain development and behavior. These microbes impact the brain by serving as moderators for neurotransmitters and neuropeptides, and are involved with complicated neurological behaviors. Alterations in the levels of these neuro-active molecules are involved in autism and Parkinson's disease.

Hsiao investigated how the maternal microbiome impacts fetal brain development. She found that depleting the microbioata of a maternal gut damaged fetal brain development, altering the specific genes which are switched on and how axons between neurons formed. She showed that there were fewer axons which connect the thalamus to the cortex, and gave rise to sensory impairments.

In 2013, Hsiao delivered a TEDx talk on how microbes can alter brain function.

Awards and honours 
 2014 Forbes 30 Under 30
 2015 Kavli Fellow of the National Academy of Sciences
 2017 Life Sciences Excellence Award
 2018 Ben Barres Early Career Acceleration Award
 2018 New York Stem Cell Foundation Robertson Neuroscience Investigator
 2019 UCLA Life Sciences Excellence Award – Excellence in Research, Assistant Professor
 2021 Scialog Fellow
 2022 New York Academy of Sciences (Takeda Pharmaceuticals) Innovators in Science Award in Gastroenterology
 2022 Blavatnik National Awards for Young Scientists

Selected publications

References

Living people
American women neuroscientists
University of California alumni
California Institute of Technology alumni
University of California, Los Angeles faculty
Year of birth missing (living people)